Kjerringøy is a former municipality in Nordland county, Norway. The  municipality existed from 1906 until its dissolution in 1964. The municipality included the coastal and island areas around the entrance to the Folda fjord, plus the northern coast of the Mistfjorden to the south of the Folda fjord. The areas are located in what is now Bodø Municipality and a small part in Steigen Municipality. The administrative centre of the municipality was the village of Kjerringøy where Kjerringøy Church is located.

History
The municipality of Kjerringøy was established on 1 January 1906 when the old municipality of Nordfold-Kjerringøy was split into Kjerringøy (population: 857) and Nordfold (population: 1,485).  During the 1960s, there were many municipal mergers across Norway due to the work of the Schei Committee.  On 1 January 1964, the municipality of Kjerringøy ceased to exist.  Most of Kjerringøy (population: 524) was incorporated into the municipality of Bodin, its neighbor to the south. The Brennsund district north of the Folda fjord (population: 30), was incorporated into Steigen Municipality. Prior to the merger Kjerringøy had a population of 574.  Later, on 1 January 1968, Bodin (including most of Kjerringøy) was incorporated into the Bodø Municipality.

Name
The municipality (originally the parish) is named after the old Kjerringøy farm since the first Kjerringøy Church was built there.

Government
While it existed, this municipality was responsible for primary education (through 10th grade), outpatient health services, senior citizen services, unemployment, social services, zoning, economic development, and municipal roads. During its existence, this municipality was governed by a municipal council of elected representatives, which in turn elected a mayor.

Municipal council
The municipal council  of Kjerringøy was made up of representatives that were elected to four year terms.  The party breakdown of the final municipal council was as follows:

Mayors
The mayors of Kjerringøy:

 1906–1907: Peder Nilssen-Fjære 
 1908–1934: Gerhard Kristiansen
 1935–1937: Elling Tidemann
 1938–1940: Otto Fredriksen
 1940–1945: Rolf Johnsen
 1945–1947: Otto Fredriksen
 1948–1959: Henry Skålsvik
 1960–1963: Berby Johansen

See also
List of former municipalities of Norway

References

Bodø
Steigen
Former municipalities of Norway
1906 establishments in Norway
1964 disestablishments in Norway